Crowthers is an Australian coach charter coach company in Sydney. Until January 2009 it operated route bus services in the Sutherland Shire.

History
In the early 1900s, S Crowthers and Sons Pty Ltd established a small bus service in Thirroul eventually expanding further south to Dapto. In 1952 Crowthers began operations in Sydney purchasing route 65 that operated between Cronulla railway station and South Cronulla from Ryder & Moore. In 1966 the service was extended to Caringbah.

In 1998 Barry and Paul Crowther purchased the company from their family.

For the Sydney Olympic Games in 2000 Crowthers were contracted to manage a fleet of 126 buses and over 200 drivers Olympic sponsors.

When the Sydney Metropolitan Bus System Contracts were established in 2005, the operation area of Crowthers Bus Service belonged to part of region 11, which was shared with Tiger Tours and Maianbar Bundeena Bus Service. 

In January 2009 Veolia Transport purchased the route bus operations of Crowthers with six buses.

Crowthers had also operated coaches since at least June 1981 when a new Domino Tourmaster was purchased. This part of the business continues with a fleet of three coaches operated as at May 2014 out of a depot adjoining Sydney Airport. Two of the coaches were painted in Australian Pacific Tours livery from 2005 to 2012. Crowthers had previously acted as a sub-contractor to the tourism company.

BusLink
With the introduction of the Passenger Transport Act of 1990, there was a consolidation of routes. Both Crowther's routes 65 and 66 and Nicholson's route 67 Cronulla to Kurnell were covered by one contract, leading to the operators combining their services under the BusLink brand in November 1992.

The routes were restructured with 984 and 985 operated by Crowthers and 987 by Nicholsons:

In May 2000 Crowthers took over the operation of Nicholson's service.

Crowthers also operated the Shire Shuttle, a Sutherland Shire Council sponsored late-night/early morning service providing free transport from major pubs and clubs. Crowthers also ran a service called the Sharks Shuttle which provided a free service to Endeavour Field from Heathcote, Engadine and Sutherland during Cronulla Sharks home games.

References

Bus companies of New South Wales
Bus transport in Sydney